George Goschen may refer to:

 George Goschen, 1st Viscount Goschen (1831–1907), a British statesman and businessman
 George Goschen, 2nd Viscount Goschen (1866–1952), his son, a British politician
 Georg Joachim Göschen (1752–1858), his grandfather, a German publisher